This article includes a list of 57 member states of the Organisation of Islamic Cooperation (OIC) sorted by their gross domestic product (GDP) at purchasing power parity (PPP), the value of all final goods and services produced within a nation in a given year.

Notes
 IMF, October 2012

See also
 Organisation of Islamic Cooperation
 Economy of the Organisation of Islamic Cooperation
 List of Organisation of Islamic Cooperation member states by GDP per capita (PPP)
 List of Organisation of Islamic Cooperation member states by exports
 List of Organisation of Islamic Cooperation member states by imports

Islamic Cooperation Organisation
Organisation of Islamic Cooperation-related lists